Tovata is one of three confederacies comprising the Fijian House of Chiefs, to which all of Fiji's chiefs belong.

Details of Tovata
It is located in the north east of the country, covering the provinces of Bua, Macuata and Cakaudrove on the northern island Vanua Levu, as well as the Lau Islands.

Paramount Title of Tovata
The Tovata Confederacy, (like the Kubuna and Burebasaga confederacies) is a recent invention.  It was conceived in 14 February 1867 by Ma’afu as cited in the Na Mata as follows:
 
A tauyavutaka na turaga ni Toga o Ma'afu ena nona via vakacokovatataka na vanua era vakarorogo vua, ena veirogorogoci kei ira na turaga ni vanua o Bua, Macuata, Cakaudrove kei Lau.

Lau here only refers to Lakeba and its neighboring islands, not the entire Lau today.
 
The key word here is "veirogorogoci" which denotes "listening to each other".  In other words, this confederacy's membership are equal in rank which is why during traditional oratures and discourses, it is referred to as "Matanitu Veiwekani.  Seen another way, this is Fiji's equivalent of a United Nations of sorts, where each chief is of equal ranking with other chiefs in the Tovata jurisdiction.
 
Kubuna and Burebasaga confederacies, on the other hand have layers upon layers of chief, vassal warlord, chieftain and ranks within ranks, underscoring its long alliances and relationships in-built into it.  Tovata is not like that.  It is more even and democratic in structure.  It was conceived by Ma’afu and headed by the British consul in Levuka as its prime minister.

There is no paramount chief in the Tovata Confederacy.  However, the chiefly title of Tui Cakau is regarded as the most senior in the Tovata Confederacy, and the third most senior in the country.

Notable Fijians of Tovata
Although the smallest of the three confederacies, Tovata has been the most politically influential.  Ratu Sir Lala Sukuna, considered the father of modern Fiji, was from Tovata, as were Ratu Sir Kamisese Mara, Fiji's longtime first prime minister and second president; Ratu Sir Penaia Ganilau, the first president of Fiji.  In addition, Sitiveni Rabuka, incumbent prime minister, former Attorney General, Qoriniasi Bale and Laisenia Qarase. Other notable leaders are Tui Cakau Ratu Naiqama Lalabalavu and Ratu Epeli Ganilau, both of whom have been politically active.

Business persons also from Tovata include Roko Matai of the Yatu Lau and Mere Samisoni, founder of the bakery chain Hot Bread Kitchen and a former Member of Parliament.

References
 Broken Waves: A History of the Fiji Islands in the Twentieth Century - Page 233, by Brij V. Lal - 1992, Reference to Tovata as a Confederacy
  Australia's Arc of Instability: The Political and Cultural Dynamics of Regional Security - Page 251 - 258, by Dennis Rumley, Vivian Louis Forbes, Christopher Griffin - 2006, reference Tovata as a confederacy and how it was formed

Further reading
 Tovata I & II By AC Reid, Printed in Fiji by Oceania printers Fiji (1990)

External links
Sources: Maori News (Fiji Supplement); Tui Cakau
Nakorotubu District - origin of the 1st Vunivalu of Kubuna.

Confederacies of Fiji
Fijian chiefs
Bua Province
Cakaudrove Province
Macuata Province